Ategumia matutinalis is a moth of the family Crambidae described by Achille Guenée in 1854. It is found in Central America, South America and the Antilles, including Puerto Rico, Trinidad, French Guiana, Suriname, Ecuador and Jamaica. It was introduced to Hawaii for the control of Clidemia hirta, although researchers thought they were introducing Ategumia ebulealis.

The larvae feed on Heterotrichum cymosum and Clidemia species, including C. hirta. They roll the leaves of their host plant.

References

External links
Moths of Jamaica

Moths described in 1854
Spilomelinae
Moths of North America
Moths of South America